Cliff Woodbury (July 8, 1894 –  November 13, 1984) was an American racecar driver. Cliff raced all over the US during one of the most dangerous times in motorsports.

Woodbury was born in Chicago, Illinois. He started his career about 1915 running in state fairs across the Midwest in his Duesenberg, winning purses that sometimes amounted to more than $500. In 1921 and 1922, he worked with Ruth Law with her barnstorming Flying Circus which paired a race car and bi-plane. The highlight of the show was when a female daredevil would climb a ladder from the Cliff's race car to the plane while both were racing around the track.

Woodbury was a popular local hero at the motor sports tracks in Chicago and appeared often in The Chicago Tribune with his Fronty Ford. AAA named Cliff the Dirt Tack Champion of the Nation in 1924, 1925 and 1926.

In 1926, Woodbury joined Mike Boyle's Boyle Valve Racing Team and began his career on board tracks driving supercharged Millers. Woodbury finished third on his first attempt at the Indianapolis 500 in 1926 and set the pole in qualifying in 1929. Woodbury also set the one mile (1.6 km) record at Daytona Beach in 1930 with a run of  Woodbury retired after a severe wreck in Altoona, Pennsylvania in June 1929 which killed the 1929 Indy 500 winner, Ray Keech.

After retirement Woodbury established a successful auto repair business "Woodbury Bros" with his brother Elmer which was based in Chicago. He died in 1984 in Alton, Illinois.

Indianapolis 500 results

References

Indianapolis 500 drivers
Indianapolis 500 polesitters
People from Alton, Illinois
1894 births
1984 deaths
Racing drivers from Chicago
AAA Championship Car drivers